Micro-Enterprise Development Programme (MEDEP) is non-profit organisation of Nepal to translate the broader vision of the government's Ninth Five-Year Plan, which is to try and address poverty through the development of micro-enterprises among low-income families.

Objectives
Providing skill and business training and other support, mainly for women and poor and disadvantaged people to set up micro-enterprises;
Helping establish business support services and representative organisations for micro-entrepreneurs; and
Working with the government to improve the policy environment.

References

External links
https://www.youtube.com/watch?v=WiUX8m0d-_o

Economy of Nepal